The Happy Road is a 1957 French-American comedy film starring Gene Kelly, Barbara Laage, Michael Redgrave and Bobby Clark. Its plot involves two students (a boy and girl) who escape from their Swiss private school and make for Paris.  Their respective parents, an American father and a French mother, together embark on a wide journey around the countryside, getting local police involved in finding them, with many whimsical situations, including riding on a police motorcycle, and encountering military maneuvers and a bicycle race.

Plot

Cast
Mike Andrews —	Gene Kelly
Suzanne Duval — Barbara Laage
Danny Andrews — Bobby Clark
Janine Duval — Brigitte Fossey
General Medworth — Michael Redgrave
Doctor Salaise — Roger Tréville
Hélène — Colette Dereal
Madame Fallière — Maryse Martin
Motorcycle Officer — Van Doude
Armbruster — Colin Mann
The Woodcutter — Alexandre Rignault
David, Earl of Bardingham — T. Bartlett
Carpenter — Paul Préboist

Critical reception
Allmovie wrote, "The Happy Road tends to bludgeon its audience with whimsy at time," but noted, "Gene Kelly, as always, is charming, and less affected than usual" ; while The New York Times praised the film as "a lively and charming little tale" concluding, "Mr. Kelly rates a good hand for this picture. So does Metro-Goldwyn-Mayer."

Box office
According to MGM records, the film earned $325,000 in the US and Canada and $625,000 elsewhere, resulting in a loss of $117,000.

See also
 List of American films of 1957

References

External links

1957 films
1957 comedy films
American comedy road movies
American black-and-white films
1950s comedy road movies
Films directed by Gene Kelly
Films set in France
Films set in Switzerland
Films shot in France
French comedy films
Metro-Goldwyn-Mayer films
Films with screenplays by Harry Kurnitz
1950s English-language films
1950s American films
1950s French films